Robert Kenneth Cook (13 June 1924 – 1997) was an English professional footballer who played for Letchworth, Reading, Tottenham Hotspur and Watford.

Playing career
Cook began his career with non-league club Letchworth before joining Reading. In July, 1949 the Wwinger signed for Tottenham Hotspur where he featured in three first team matches in 1949. He transferred to Watford in August, 1951 and went on to make a further 53 appearances and scoring on eight occasions.

References

1924 births
1997 deaths
People from Letchworth
English footballers
English Football League players
Reading F.C. players
Tottenham Hotspur F.C. players
Watford F.C. players
Association football wingers
Letchworth F.C. players